Beyond the Wall of Tears is a 1984 role-playing game adventure for Tunnels & Trolls published by Flying Buffalo.

Plot summary
Beyond the Wall of Tears is a solo adventure in which the player character's younger sister has been kidnapped.

Reception
Philip L. Wing reviewed Beyond the Wall of Tears in The Space Gamer No. 72. Wing commented that "Beyond the Wall of Tears makes a good, but not excellent, addition to your Tunnels & Trolls solo collection."

References

Role-playing game supplements introduced in 1984
Tunnels & Trolls adventures